Suyyash Rai (born 24 March 1989) is an Indian television actor and singer. His first TV appearance was on Chandigarh auditions of Roadies 5.0. He is known for his role of Abhay on Rishta Likhenge Hum Naya on Sony TV. He was a contestant in Bigg Boss 9 in 2015.

Career
Rai started his acting career on the popular Indian supernatural show Pyaar Kii Ye Ek Kahaani as Neil Khurana. He has appeared on many popular daily series like Kya Hua Tera Vaada and Kaisa Yeh Ishq Hai... Ajab Sa Risk Hai. He loves to play negative roles. He was seen in the series Phir Bhi Na Maane...Badtameez Dil on Star Plus. He was a contestant in Bigg Boss Season 9. He got evicted on Day 82.

He has walked several ramp shows and has also done many advertisements.

He has also captained cricket team Delhi Dragons in Box Cricket League, and led them to the title victory in BCL's maiden season aired on Sony TV.

Rai along with his then-girlfriend Kishwer Merchant entered the Bigg Boss 9 Double Trouble house. He was partnered up with Rimi Sen, then was changed with Prince Narula. Rai also appeared in action-thriller web series Dangerous in 2020.

Personal life

Rai got married on 16 December 2016 to Kishwer Merchant, his co-star from Pyaar Kii Ye Ek Kahaani. It was a simple court marriage followed by a reception with the mehndi and sangeet ceremonies.

On 2 March 2021 the couple announced that they were expecting their first child in August. On 27 August 2021, the couple became parents to a boy, Nirvair.

Filmography

Web series

Television

Discography 
Rai and Kishwar Merchant debuted on his album Khushnuma. He also sang "Teri Meri Dosti" with Darshan Raval. In 2015, for his show Phir Bhi Na Maane...Badtameez Dil, Rai sang the song "Yaadein Teri (Jeene Ki Duaa)".

Music Videos

References

External links

 
 
 

21st-century Indian male actors
Punjabi people
Indian male television actors
Indian male models
Indian male soap opera actors
Male actors from Mumbai
1985 births
Year of birth uncertain
Living people
Bigg Boss (Hindi TV series) contestants
Indian Hindus